The Gibraltar Intermediate Cup is a knock-out association football competition for under-23 sides in Gibraltar, organised by the Gibraltar Football Association. The cup was formed in 2018, with its first edition held that year. In its first edition, 9 teams competed, with a first round played by two teams in order to allow for an 8 team quarter final in the next round.

The competition was scrapped after one edition, but returned in the 2022–23 season under a revised format, including a group stage.

References

External links
Gibraltar Football Association

National association football cups
Cup
2018 establishments in Gibraltar
Recurring sporting events established in 2018